Humanix Books is an American print and e-book publishing house and a division of conservative news network Newsmax Media. The company publishes books in the areas of health, personal finance, current affairs, and politics. Books by the company are distributed by Two Rivers Distribution.

The company began operations in 1969. The first titles by the company were published in response to the need for higher quality classroom materials to support learning. In 2012 the company was acquired by Newsmax Media and shortly after Anthony Ziccardi was named the publisher of Humanix Books. The company released The ObamaCare Survival Guide by Nick J. Tate that same year. The book is about the arguments against the Affordable Care Act and it became a number one New York Times Best Seller in the Paperback Advice & Misc. category for paperback books. In 2015 Mary Glenn replaced Anthony Ziccardi as the publisher of the company. In 2019, Adam Keith Pfeffer was named the deputy publisher of the company.

References

External links
 

Book publishing companies based in New York City
Publishing companies established in 1969